Argentina Cove is a 1.28 km wide embayment indenting for 330 m the southeast coast of Hurd Peninsula, Livingston Island in the South Shetland Islands, Antarctica.  It is part of South Bay, entered between Polish Bluff and Henry Bluff.  The area was frequented by early 19th century sealers operating from nearby Johnsons Dock.

The feature was mapped and named by the Spanish Antarctic Expedition in 1991.

Location

Maps
 Isla Livingston: Península Hurd. Mapa topográfico de escala 1:25000. Madrid: Servicio Geográfico del Ejército, 1991. (Map reproduced on p. 16 of the linked work)
 L.L. Ivanov. Livingston Island: Central-Eastern Region. Scale 1:25000 topographic map.  Sofia: Antarctic Place-names Commission of Bulgaria, 1996.
 L.L. Ivanov et al. Antarctica: Livingston Island and Greenwich Island, South Shetland Islands. Scale 1:100000 topographic map. Sofia: Antarctic Place-names Commission of Bulgaria, 2005.
 L.L. Ivanov. Antarctica: Livingston Island and Greenwich, Robert, Snow and Smith Islands. Scale 1:120000 topographic map.  Troyan: Manfred Wörner Foundation, 2009.  
 Antarctic Digital Database (ADD). Scale 1:250000 topographic map of Antarctica. Scientific Committee on Antarctic Research (SCAR). Since 1993, regularly upgraded and updated.
 L.L. Ivanov. Antarctica: Livingston Island and Smith Island. Scale 1:100000 topographic map. Manfred Wörner Foundation, 2017.

References
 SCAR Composite Antarctic Gazetteer.

Coves of Livingston Island
Spain and the Antarctic
Argentina and the Antarctic